Thomas Hardwick Sr. (1725–1798) was an 18th-century architect.  The Hardwick name is famous in British architecture, spanning over 150 years of work.  In 1760, Thomas Hardwick Sr. had become a master mason at Syon House for the brothers Robert and John Adam.  His son Thomas Hardwick was also an architect.

References

1725 births
1798 deaths
Architects from London
18th-century English architects